L'impresario in angustie is an operatic farsa in one act by composer Domenico Cimarosa with an Italian libretto by Giuseppe Maria Diodati. The opera premiered at the Teatro Nuovo in Naples, Italy in 1786.

Roles

Recordings
L'impresario in angustie with conductor Fabio Maestri, the Associazione Sinfonica Umbra, and the Orchestra In Canto (November 1997).
L'impresario in angustie with conductor Aldo Salvagno, the Orchestra Bruno Maderna di Forli (2018)

References 
Notes

External links
 Online Italian libretto

1786 operas
Italian-language operas
Farse
Operas
Operas by Domenico Cimarosa